Md Ashraful Alam (born 1 February 1983) better known as Ashraf Shishir is a Bangladeshi independent film director, screenwriter and human rights activist. He received Bangladesh National Film Awards in 2014 for Gariwala. It has been screened at 65 international film festivals in 22 countries and has earned 24 international awards.

His film Amra Ekta Cinema Banabo is the longest non-experimental film ever made.

Biography
Shishir graduated in information technology and earned his masters' in International human rights law. He is the author of four books.

Filmography

Note:Films in Bengali-language unless mentioned otherwise.

Music Video

Awards
<div class="noprint">

References

External links 
 

Bangladeshi film directors
1983 births
Living people